Stilleite is a selenide mineral, zinc selenide, with the formula ZnSe. It has been found only as microscopic gray crystals occurring as inclusions in linnaeite associated with other selenide and sulfides. It was originally discovered in Katanga Province, Zaire in 1956 and is named for the German geologist, Hans Stille (1876–1966).

It has been reported from the Santa Brigida mine, La Rioja Province, Argentina and from Tilkerode (Abberode) in the Harz Mountains, Germany. Associated minerals include pyrite, linnaeite, clausthalite, selenian vaesite, molybdenite and dolomite in the Shinkolobwe region of the Congo); and with tiemannite, clausthalite, eucairite, umangite, klockmannite in the  Santa Brigida mine, Argentina.

See also
List of minerals
List of minerals named after people

References

Zinc minerals
Selenide minerals
Cubic minerals
Minerals in space group 216
Minerals described in 1956